Browneopsis is a genus of flowering plants in the family Fabaceae. There are about 8 species native to South America.

Species include:
 Browneopsis disepala
 Browneopsis excelsa
 Browneopsis macrofoliolata
Browneopsis puyensis
 Browneopsis sanintiae
 Browneopsis ucayalina

References

Detarioideae
Fabaceae genera
Taxonomy articles created by Polbot